The 1911 South Carolina Gamecocks football team represented the University of South Carolina as an independent during the 1911 college football season. Led by John Neff in his second and final season as head coach, South Carolina compiled a record of 1–4–2.

Schedule

References

South Carolina
South Carolina Gamecocks football seasons
South Carolina Gamecocks football